This is a list of battalions of the King's Own Royal Regiment (Lancaster), which existed as an infantry regiment of the British Army from 1881 to 1959.

Original composition
When the 4th (King's Own) Regiment of Foot became the King's Own (Royal Lancaster Regiment) in 1881 under the Cardwell-Childers reforms of the British Armed Forces, three pre-existent militia and volunteer battalions of Lancaster were integrated into the structure of the regiment. Volunteer battalions had been created in reaction to a perceived threat of invasion by France in the late 1850s. Organised as "rifle volunteer corps", they were independent of the British Army and composed primarily of the middle class. The only change to the regiment's structure during the period of 1881-1908 occurred in 1900, when the 2nd Volunteer Battalion was raised, and when the 4th (Militia) Battalion disbanded in 1908.

Reorganisation

The Territorial Force (later Territorial Army) was formed in 1908, which the volunteer battalions joined, while the militia battalions transferred to the "Special Reserve". Both of the volunteer battalions were renumbered to create a single sequential order.

First World War

The regiment fielded 17 battalions and lost 6,515 officers and other ranks during the course of the war. The regiment's territorial components formed duplicate second and third line battalions. As an example, the three-line battalions of the 4th Battalion were numbered as the 1/4th, 2/4th, and 3/4th respectively. A number of the battalions were formed as part of Secretary of State for War Lord Kitchener's appeal for an initial 100,000 men volunteers in 1914. They were referred to as the New Army or Kitchener's Army. The 11th, New Army "Service" battalion, was referred to as Bantam battalion because it was predominantly composed of men under the prewar height limit. The Volunteer Training Corps were raised with overage or reserved occupation men early in the war, and were initially self-organised into many small corps, with a wide variety of names. Recognition of the corps by the authorities brought regulation and as the war continued the small corps were formed into battalion sized units of the county Volunteer Regiment. In 1918 these were linked to county regiments.

Inter-War
By 1922, all of the regiment's war-raised battalions had disbanded. The Special Reserve reverted to its militia designation in 1921, then to the Supplementary Reserve in 1924; however, its battalions were effectively placed in 'suspended animation'. As World War II approached, the Territorial Army was reorganised in the mid-1930s, many of its infantry battalions were converted to other roles, especially anti-aircraft.

Second World War
The regiment’s expansion during the Second World War was modest compared to 1914–1918. Existing battalions formed duplicates as in the First World War, while National Defence Companies were combined to create a new "Home Defence" battalion. In addition to this, 5 battalions of the Home Guard were affiliated to the regiment. These wore the 'EL' designation, the remaining 18 wearing this patch were cap-badged to other regiments. A number of Light Anti-Aircraft (LAA) troops were formed from the local battalions to defend specific points, such as factories. Due to the daytime (or shift working) occupations of the men in the LAA troops, the troops required eight times the manpower of an equivalent regular unit.

Post-World War II

In the immediate post-war period, the army was significantly reduced: nearly all infantry regiments had their first and second battalions amalgamated and the Supplementary Reserve disbanded.

Amalgamation
The 1957 Defence White Paper stated that the King's Own Royal Regiment was due to be amalgamated with the Border Regiment, to form the King's Own Royal Border Regiment on the 1 October 1959.

References

Bibliography
 J.B.M. Frederick, Lineage Book of British Land Forces 1660–1978, Vol I, Wakefield: Microform Academic, 1984, .
 Col George Jackson Hay, An Epitomized History of the Militia (The Constitutional Force), London:United Service Gazette, 1905/Ray Westlake Military Books, 1987 ISBN 0-9508530-7-0.
 Brig E.A. James, British Regiments 1914–18, Samson Books 1978/Uckfield: Naval & Military Press, 2001, .
 H.G. Parkyn, 'English Militia Regiments 1757–1935: Their Badges and Buttons', Journal of the Society for Army Historical Research, Vol 15, No 60 (Winter 1936), pp. 216–248.
 Ray Westlake, Tracing the Rifle Volunteers: A Guide for Military and Family Historians, Barnsley: Pen and Sword, 2010, .

King's Own Royal Regiment (Lancaster)
King's Own Royal Regiment (Lancaster), List of battalions
King's Own Royal Regiment (Lancaster)
King's Own Royal Regiment (Lancaster)
Battalions